Mahajeran-e Abu ol Hasan (also Romanized as Mahājerān-e Abū ol Ḩasan; also known as Mahajaran Molla Abolhasan, Mahājerān-e Mollā Abol Ḩasan, Mahājerān-e Mollā Abū ol Ḩasan, Mahājerān-e Mollā Ḩasan, Mohājerān-e Mollā Abū ol Ḩasanī, and Mohājerān-e Mollā Ḩasan) is a village in Pol-e Doab Rural District, Zalian District, Shazand County, Markazi Province, Iran. At the 2006 census, its population was 27, in 7 families.

References 

Populated places in Shazand County